This is a list of past and current experiments at the CERN Super Proton Synchrotron (SPS) facility since its commissioning in 1976. The SPS was used as the main particle collider for many experiments, and has been adapted to various purpose ever since its inception. Four locations were used for experiments, the North Area (NA experiments), West Area (WA experiments), Underground Area (UA experiments), and the Endcap MUon detectors (EMU experiments).

The UA1 and UA2 experiments famously detected the W and Z bosons in the early 1980s. Following this, Carlo Rubbia and Simon van der Meer won the 1984 Nobel Prize in Physics.

The list is first compiled from the INSPIRE-HEP database, then missing information is retrieved from the online version CERN's Grey Book. The most specific information of the two is kept, e.g. if the INSPIRE database lists November 1974, while the Grey Book lists 22 November 1974, the Grey Book entry is shown. When there is a conflict between the INSPIRE database and the Grey Book, the INSPIRE database information is listed, unless otherwise noted.

EMU experiments
EMU = endcap muon

NA experiments
NA = north area

UA experiments
UA = underground area

WA experiments
WA = west area

See also
Experiments
List of CERN experiments
List of Large Hadron Collider experiments

Facilities
CERN: European Organization for Nuclear Research
PS: Proton Synchrotron
SPS: Super Proton Synchrotron
ISOLDE: On-Line Isotope Mass Separator
ISR: Intersecting Storage Rings
LEP: Large Electron–Positron Collider
LHC: Large Hadron Collider
AD: Antiproton Decelerator

References

External links
CERN website
SPS website
CERN Grey Book
INSPIRE-HEP database

SPS
Particle experiments